Linda Horvath (born 10 February 1978) is an Austrian athlete. She competed in the women's high jump at the 2000 Summer Olympics.

References

1978 births
Living people
Athletes (track and field) at the 2000 Summer Olympics
Austrian female high jumpers
Olympic athletes of Austria
Place of birth missing (living people)